Runeč is a settlement in the hills north of Ormož in northeastern Slovenia. The area belonged to the traditional region of Styria. It is now included in the Drava Statistical Region.

The local church is dedicated to the Holy Family and belongs to the Parish of Velika Nedelja.

References

External links
Runeč on Geopedia

Populated places in the Municipality of Ormož